Pictocolumbella is a genus of sea snails, marine gastropod mollusks in the family Columbellidae, the dove snails.

Species
Species within the genus Pictocolumbella include:
 Pictocolumbella ocellata (Link, 1807)

References

External links

Columbellidae